Kermia is a genus of sea snails, marine gastropod mollusks in the family Raphitomidae.

This genus is closely related to Pseudodaphnella Boettger, 1895. They form together a genus-complex with a highly underestimated diversity, leading to intermixed clades. The lack of morphologic criteria requires the generic assignment of several species clearly to be reconsidered.

Description
The elongate, fusiform shell has a narrow aperture that is nearly half the length of the shell. The protoconch consists of two whorls. But only in a few species the sculpture of the protoconch is coarsely diagonally reticulate. The shell structure is reticulate with glossy nodules on the intersections of the ribs and lirae. The siphonal canal is short and wide. The  U-shaped or linguiform anal sinus is deep, located near the suture and is surrounded by a thick outer lip. The outer lip is denticulate within. The columella is smooth.

Distribution
This marine genus is widely distributed in the Indo Pacific, from the Red Sea to Easter Island; off Queensland, Australia

Species
Species within the genus Kermia include:

 Kermia aegyptiaca Kilburn & Dekker, 2008
 Kermia aglaia (Melvill, 1904)
 Kermia albicaudata (Smith E. A., 1882)
 Kermia albifuniculata (Reeve, 1846)
 Kermia alveolata (Dautzenberg, 1912)
 Kermia aniani Kay, 1979
 Kermia apicalis (Montrouzier in Souverbie, 1861) 
 Kermia benhami Oliver, 1915
 Kermia bifasciata (Pease, 1860)
 Kermia brunnea (Pease, 1860)
 † Kermia bulbosa Harzhauser, 2014  
 Kermia caletria (Melvill & Standen, 1896)
 Kermia canistra (Hedley, 1922)
 Kermia catharia (Melvill, 1917)
 Kermia cavernosa (Reeve, 1845)
 Kermia chichijimana (Pilsbry, 1904)
 Kermia clathurelloides Kilburn, 2009
 Kermia crassula Rehder, 1980
 Kermia cylindrica (Pease, 1860)
 Kermia daedalea (Garrett, 1873)  
 Kermia drupelloides Kilburn, 2009
 Kermia episema (Melvill & Standen, 1896) 
 Kermia eugenei Kilburn, 2009
 Kermia euryacme (Melvill, 1927)
 Kermia euzonata (Hervier, 1897) 
 Kermia felina (Reeve, 1843) 
 Kermia geraldsmithi Kilburn, 2009
 Kermia granosa (Dunker, 1871)
 Kermia harenula (Hedley, 1922)
 Kermia informa McLean & Poorman, 1971
 Kermia irretita (Hedley, 1899)
 Kermia lutea (Pease, 1860)
 Kermia maculosa (Pease, 1863)
 Kermia margaritifera (Reeve, 1846)
 Kermia melanoxytum (Hervier, 1896)
 Kermia netrodes Melvill, 1917
 Kermia producta (Pease, 1860)
 Kermia pumila (Mighels, 1845)
 Kermia punctifera (Garrett, 1873) 
 Kermia pustulosum (Folin, 1867)
 Kermia sagenaria Rehder, 1980
 Kermia spanionema Melvill, 1917
 Kermia subcylindrica (Hervier, 1897)
 Kermia tessellata (Hinds, 1843)
 Kermia thespesia (Melvill & Standen, 1896)
 Kermia thorssoni Chang, 2001
 Kermia tippetti Chang, 2001
 Kermia tokyoensis (Pilsbry, 1895)

Species brought into synonymy
 Kermia anxia Hedley, 1909 : synonym of Exomilus edychrous (Hervier, 1897)
 Kermia barnardi (Brazier, 1876): synonym of Pseudodaphnella barnardi (Brazier, 1876)
 Kermia chrysolitha (Melvill & Standen, 1896): synonym of Kermia punctifera (Garrett, 1873)
 Kermia clandestina Deshayes, 1863: synonym of Kermia pumila clandestina (Deshayes, 1863)
 Kermia edychroa (Hervier, 1897): synonym of Exomilus edychrous (Hervier, 1897)
 Kermia gracilis de Folin, 1879 : synonym of Exomilus edychrous (Hervier, 1897)
 Kermia hirsuta (de Folin, 1867): synonym of Microdaphne trichodes (Dall, 1919) 
 Kermia margaritifera Reeve, 1846: synonym of Kermia foraminata (Reeve, 1845)
 Kermia mauritiana Sowerby, 1893: synonym of Kermia producta (Pease, 1860)
 Kermia oligoina Hedley, 1922: synonym of Pseudodaphnella oligoina Hedley, 1922
 Kermia picta Dunker, 1871: synonym of Philbertia felina (Reeve, 1843)
 Kermia pyrgodea (Melvill, 1917): synonym of Kermia producta (Pease, 1860)
 Kermia receptoria (Melvill & Standen, 1901): synonym of Daphnella receptoria Melvill & Standen, 1901
 Kermia rufolirata (Hervier, 1897): synonym of Pseudodaphnella rufolirata (Hervier, 1897)
 Kermia semilineata Garrett, 1873 : synonym of Kermia granosa (Dunker, 1871)
 Kermia spelaeodea (Hervier, 1897): synonym of Pseudodaphnella infrasulcata (Garrett, 1873)
 Kermia subspurca (Hervier, 1896): synonym of Hemilienardia subspurca (Hervier, 1896)
 Kermia thereganum Melvill & Standen, 1896: synonym of Kermia lutea (Pease, 1860)
 Kermia violacea Pease, W.H., 1868 : synonym of Kermia pumila (Mighels, 1845) 
Species that are nomem dubium
 Kermia foraminata (Reeve, 1845)

References

 Bouchet P., Kantor Yu.I., Sysoev A. & Puillandre N. (2011) A new operational classification of the Conoidea. Journal of Molluscan Studies 77: 273-308.
 Powell, A.W.B. 1966. The molluscan families Speightiidae and Turridae, an evaluation of the valid taxa, both Recent and fossil, with list of characteristic species. Bulletin of the Auckland Institute and Museum. Auckland, New Zealand 5: 1–184, pls 1–23 
 Kilburn, R. N. 2009. Genus Kermia (Mollusca: Gastropoda: Conoidea: Conidae: Raphitominae) in South African waters, with observations on the identities of related extralimital species. African Invertebrates 50(2): 217-236

External links
 
 Gastropods.com for images
 Worldwide Mollusc Species Data Base: Raphitomidae
 Oliver W.R.B. (1915) The Mollusca of the Kermadec Islands. Transactions and Proceedings of the New Zealand Institute, 47, 509–568, pls. 9–12
 Fedosov, Alexander E., and Nicolas Puillandre. "Phylogeny and taxonomy of the Kermia–Pseudodaphnella (Mollusca: Gastropoda: Raphitomidae) genus complex: a remarkable radiation via diversification of larval development." Systematics and Biodiversity 10.4 (2012): 447-477
 Baoquan Li & Xinzheng Li (2014) Report on the Raphitomidae Bellardi, 1875 (Mollusca: Gastropoda: Conoidea) from the China Seas, Journal of Natural History, 48:17-18, 999-1025

 
Raphitomidae
Gastropod genera